The harpē was a type of sword or sickle; a sword with a sickle protrusion along one edge near the tip of the blade. The harpe is mentioned in Greek and Roman sources, and almost always in mythological contexts.

Harpe in mythology 
The harpe sword is most notably identified as the weapon used by Cronus to castrate and depose his father, Uranus.  Alternately, that weapon is identified as a more traditional sickle or scythe.  The harpe, scythe or sickle was either a flint or adamantine (diamond) blade, and was provided to Cronus by his mother, Gaia. According to an ancient myth recorded in Hesiod's Theogony, Uranus had cast his and Gaia's children, the Cyclopes and Hecatonchires, down into Tartarus. The enraged Gaia plotted Uranus' downfall. She beseeched each of her sons to rise up against Uranus but was refused by all but the youngest, Cronus. So, Gaia provided him with the weapon, and when Uranus next came to lie with Gaia, Cronus leapt up into action and castrated his father, overthrowing him and driving him away forever. Thus, the blade (whether harpe, sickle or scythe) became a symbol of Cronus's power.

Perseus, a grandson of Cronus, is also regularly depicted in statues and sculpture armed with a harpe sword in his quest to slay the Gorgon, Medusa, and recover her head to use against Ceto.  Perseus was provided with such a sword by his father, Zeus (Cronus' youngest son and later overthrower), who also used the harpe to battle Typhon. Of Zeus's children, Hermes had also used the harpe to slay the titan Argus, and Heracles had defeated the Hydra with the same weapon. It is from these exchanges that the harpe got nicknames such as the Scythe of Cronus or the Sickle of Zeus.

Art representation 
In Greek and Roman art it is variously depicted, but it seems that originally it was a khopesh-like sickle-sword from Egypt. Later depictions often show it as a combination of a sword and sickle, and this odd interpretation is explicitly described in the 2nd century Leucippe and Clitophon. The image of Perseus shown with the sword is considered a modern representation by Benvenuto Cellini, an Italian sculptor and goldsmith. In ancient representation, the harpe can be seen on a collage vase in the Museum of Fine Arts Boston. This piece shows Perseus after decapitating the Gorgon, Medusa, her head in the kibisis-bag shown in Perseus' left hand as he carries the harpe in his right as he runs to Athena. The image of Perseus is doubled to show his fast pace.

See also
 Fire Iron
 Gladius
 Harpax
 Iron Age sword
 Kama
 Kelantanese klewang
 Khopesh
 Kopis
 Kusarigama
 Makhaira
 Seven-Branched Sword
 Xiphos

Notes

Ancient European swords
Ancient weapons
Mythological swords